Saint-André-de-Najac (literally Saint-André of Najac) is a commune in the Aveyron department in southern France.

Population

Inhabitants are called Saint-Andréens.

See also
Communes of the Aveyron department

References

Communes of Aveyron
Aveyron communes articles needing translation from French Wikipedia